Steve Adams may refer to:

Sportsmen
 Steve Adams (footballer, born 1958), English footballer
 Steve Adams (footballer, born 1959), English footballer
 Steve Adams (footballer, born 1980), English footballer

Musicians
 Steve Adams (musician) (born 1975), American bassist and co-founder of Animal Liberation Orchestra
 Cat Stevens (born 1948), singer who used the stage name Steve Adams

Other uses
 Steve Adams (actor) (born 1960), Canadian actor in The Second Arrival
 Steve Adams (politician) (born 1951), Tennessee State Treasurer from 1987 to 2003
 Steve Adams (writer), American screenwriter
 Steve Adams (Western Federation of Miners), played minor but important role in events surrounding the murder trial of Harry Orchard
 Steve Adams, co-founder of Steamy Window Productions, a Canadian production house in partnership with Sean Horlor

See also
 Stephen Adams (disambiguation)